Energy is an album by American jazz flautist Jeremy Steig released on the Capitol label in 1971.

Reception 

Allmusic's Jason Ankeny said: "Energy is a miracle of alchemy. Jeremy Steig transforms his flute from the ethereal to the elemental, forging a heavy, deeply funky jazz-rock record that defies gravity ... Steig creates Technicolor grooves that float like butterflies and sting like bees. His music doesn't so much fuse jazz and rock as it approaches each side from the perspective of the other, exploring their respective concepts and executions to arrive at a sound all its own. If anything, the tonal restrictions of Steig's chosen instrument push him even farther into the unknown, employing a series of acoustic and electronic innovations to expand the flute's possibilities seemingly into the infinite".

Track listing
All compositions by Jan Hammer and Jeremy Steig except where noted
 "Home" − 4:39 
 "Cakes" − 4:52 
 "Swamp Carol" − 4:11 
 "Energy" (Hammer, Steig, Don Alias, Gene Perla) − 4:50 
 "Down Stretch" (Hammer) − 4:14 
 "Give Me Some" − 6:47 
 "Come with Me" − 8:02 
 "Dance of the Mind" (Alias, Steig) − 2:22

Personnel
Jeremy Steig – flute, alto flute, bass flute, piccolo
Jan Hammer − electric piano, Chinese gong
Gene Perla − electric bass, electric upright bass
Don Alias – drums, congas, clap drums, percussion
Eddie Gómez − electric upright bass (tracks 5 & 7)
Technical
Edwin H. Kramer - engineer
Sonny Lester - executive producer

References

Capitol Records albums
Jeremy Steig albums
1971 albums
Albums produced by Sonny Lester
Albums recorded at Electric Lady Studios